Kõrve may refer to several places in Estonia:

Kõrve, Ida-Viru County, village in Avinurme Parish, Ida-Viru County
Kõrve, Võru County, village in Vastseliina Parish, Võru County

People
Alo Kõrve (born 1978), Estonian actor
Hele Kõrve (born 1980), Estonian actress and singer